"Shadow of Your Love" is a song by the American hard rock band Guns N' Roses, originally released as a B-side in 1987 and then later released in an alternate take as a single in 2018. It would later be included in the 2020 re-issue of the band's Greatest Hits album.

Background
"Shadow of Your Love" was written by Axl Rose and Izzy Stradlin from Hollywood Rose with help from Rose's friend Paul Tobias (Tobias later was a member of Guns N' Roses from 1994 until 2002). Rose mentioned being inspired by Thin Lizzy in writing the lyrics, and wrote the song in "about 7 minutes".

The song was first recorded by Hollywood Rose, with an original demo and two remixes later being released on The Roots of Guns N' Roses compilation.

Steven Adler explained the background of the song: "The first song we played in rehearsal was 'Shadow of Your Love,' and Axl showed up late. We were playing the song, and right in the middle of the song Axl showed up and he grabbed the microphone and was running up and down the walls screaming. I thought, 'This is the greatest thing ever.' We knew right then what we had."

In 1998, former Hollywood Rose guitarist Chris Weber sued Rose over songwriting credits, claiming he co-wrote "Shadow of Your Love" (and "Back Off Bitch" from Use Your Illusion I).

Release and promotion
The first Guns N' Roses version appeared as a B-side on the It's So Easy/Mr. Brownstone 12" single in 1987, as a "faux-live" version of the song, with overdubbed crowd noise on the studio track. The same version was also released in 1988 on the Live from the Jungle EP. The track was an outtake from the band's debut EP, Live ?!*@ Like a Suicide.

A different recording of the song was released as a B-side on the "Live and Let Die" single in 1991, which is identical to the Sound City Session version later included on the Appetite for Destruction Deluxe Edition.

A previously unreleased recording of the song was officially released as a single in 2018 to promote the Appetite for Destruction boxed set. The artwork for the single release was made by artist Arian Buhler. Buhler worked with the band previously on designing lithographs for the Not in This Lifetime... Tour. Two lyric videos were released in promotion of the single. The song is also included as 7" single in the Appetite for Destruction Locked N' Loaded Box Set, backed with the 1988 acoustic version of "Move to the City".

On June 6, 2018, the band played the song live for the first time since the Appetite for Destruction Tour.

Personnel
Guns N' Roses versions
W. Axl Rose – lead vocals
Slash – lead guitar
Izzy Stradlin – rhythm guitar, backing vocals
Duff McKagan – bass guitar, backing vocals
Steven Adler – drums, percussion

Hollywood Rose version
Axl Rose - lead vocals
Chris Weber - lead guitar
Izzy Stradlin - rhythm guitar
Steve Darrow - bass
Johnny Kreis - drums

Charts

References

Guns N' Roses songs
2018 singles
2018 songs
Songs written by Axl Rose
Songs written by Izzy Stradlin
Songs written by Paul Tobias
Speed metal songs